List of Tollywood films may refer to:
List of Bengali films
List of Telugu-language films